The NCAA Men's Division II Cross Country Championship is an annual cross country meet to decide the team and individual national champions of men's intercollegiate cross country running in the United States. It has been held every fall, usually in November, since breaking off from the NCAA University Division Men's Cross Country Championships in 1958. 

Known as the NCAA College Division Men's Cross Country Championship until 1973, it was created for cross country programs from smaller universities and colleges. A third championship, the NCAA Men's Division III Cross Country Championship, split away in 1973 when the NCAA created its current three-division structure.

The defending national teams champions are the Colorado Mines Orediggers, who won their first national title in 2015. Colorado School of Mines' Dillon Powell is the reigning individual champion, with a time of 29:28.0.

Format
The field for the championship race has ranged in size from a low of 11 teams in 1959 to a high of 59 teams in 1972.  From 1983 to 1999 the field was fixed at 17 teams.  Beginning in 2000, the national championship race has included 24 teams.  Teams compete in one of eight regional championships to qualify.  In addition to the 24 teams, 16 individual runners qualify for the national championship.

Since 1976 the race distance has been 

The event record for the 10,000 meter distance is 28:04.00, set by Shane Healy of Adams State Grizzlies in 1994.

Results 
The race distance was 4 miles from 1958 to 1967, 5 miles from 1968 to 1975, and 10,000 meters (10 kilometers) from 1976 to the present.

A † indicates a then-NCAA record-setting time for that particular distance.
A time highlighted in ██ indicates the all-time NCAA championship record for that distance.

Champions

Team titles

Individual titles by team

Individual titles by runner

 Schools highlighted in pink are closed or no longer sponsor athletics.
 Schools highlight in yellow have reclassified athletics from NCAA Division II.

See also
NCAA Men's Cross Country Championships (Division I, Division III)
NCAA Women's Cross Country Championships (Division I, Division II, Division III)
Pre-NCAA Cross Country Champions
NAIA Cross Country Championships (Men, Women)

References

External links
NCAA Division II Men's Cross Country

 Division II
Cross country, men's
Men's athletics competitions